Han Sang-hoon (born 27 October 1984) is a badminton player from South Korea. He was the champion at the 2002 World Junior Championships in the boys' doubles event. Han who was part of the Samsung Electro-Mechanic team, competed at the 2008 Summer Olympics in the mixed doubles event partnered with Hwang Yu-mi.

Achievements

Asia Championships 
Men's doubles

World Junior Championships 
Boys' doubles

Asian Junior Championships
Boys' doubles

BWF Superseries  
The BWF Superseries, launched on 14 December 2006 and implemented in 2007, is a series of elite badminton tournaments, sanctioned by Badminton World Federation (BWF). BWF Superseries has two level such as Superseries and Superseries Premier. A season of Superseries features twelve tournaments around the world, which introduced since 2011, with successful players invited to the Superseries Finals held at the year end.

Men's doubles

 BWF Superseries Finals tournament
 BWF Superseries Premier tournament
 BWF Superseries tournament

BWF Grand Prix 
The BWF Grand Prix has two levels: Grand Prix and Grand Prix Gold. It is a series of badminton tournaments, sanctioned by Badminton World Federation (BWF) since 2007. The World Badminton Grand Prix sanctioned by International Badminton Federation since 1983.

Mixed doubles

 BWF Grand Prix Gold tournament
 BWF & IBF Grand Prix tournament

BWF International Challenge/Series
Men's doubles

Mixed doubles

 BWF International Challenge tournament
 BWF International Series tournament

References

External links
 
 

1984 births
Living people
Badminton players from Seoul
South Korean male badminton players
Badminton players at the 2008 Summer Olympics
Olympic badminton players of South Korea
Kyung Hee University alumni